Evdokiya Germanova (born 8 November 1959) is a Russian actress, stage director and drama teacher.

Biography 
Evdokiya Germanova is the daughter of Aleksey Germanov, a professor of geological sciences, and Galina Dashkevich, a chemist.

Career
 In 1979, in one of the amateur performances, the main director of the Moscow Taganka Theater 
 1981–86 – a student at the actor's faculty in GITIS (Oleg Tabakov and A. Leontyev's course), a year later she joins the troupe of the Oleg Tabakov's theater studio. 
 Since 2012 she leads the workshop of the Theater Department of the Moscow Institute of Television and Radio "Ostankino" and the Higher School of Cinema and Television "Ostankino".
 In 2016 she was visiting professor at Harvard (Stanislavsky Acting School).
 In 2017 – manager of department of Theater Arts, Faculty of Theater, Cinema and Television, Synergy university.

Awards 
   1986 – All-union Festival for Young Cinematographers: Grand Prix for best actress in the 1985 film We Cannot Predict directed by Olga Narutskaya
  1991 – Molodist International Film Festival: Audience Prize and Jury Prize for best actress in the 1991 film Niagara directed by Alexander Vizir
  1992 – Karlovy Vary International Film Festival: Grand Prix The Crystal Globe for best actress in the 1991 film Kiks directed by Sergei Livnev
  1992 – Constellation /Sozvezdie Film Festival: Prize for best actress in Kiks
  1994 – Thessaloniki International Film Festival: Special Jury Mention for the film Hammer and Sickle
  1995 – Honored Artist of Russia [3]
  2000 – Winner of the International Stanislawski Prize for the role of Nastya in the play based on The Lower Depths by Maxim Gorky
  2002 – Vera Kholodnaya Prize, for The Most Graceful Actress
  2005 – Best Female Supporting Role at the Third international festival of military cinema of Yu.Ozerov (Time to Collect Stones, 2005)

Theatrical career 
Taganka Theater 
Moscow Theatre-Studio Tabakerka 
The Moscow Art Theatre (or MAT)

The Taganka Theater

•	1979 – The performance of "Rush hour" (E. Stavinsky). The director was A. Burov – Eva

•	1979 – The performance of "Romeo and Juliet" (William Shakespeare). The director was A. Demidov – Benvolio

•	1980 – The performance of "House on the embankment" (Yury Trifonov). The director was Yury Lyubimov

Moscow Theatre-Studio "Tabakerka"

•	1984 – The performance of "I nailed" (Barry Kiff). The director was Oleg Tabakov – Leann

•	1985 – The performance of "The Skylark" (Zh. Anuy). The director was Oleg Tabakov – Little Queen, Joan of Arc

•	1987 – The performance of "The Chair" (Yuri Polyakov). The director was Alexander Marin – Milochka

•	1987 – The performance of "Two arrows" – Tribe people

•	1987 – The performance of "Ali Baba et al". – Fatima, wife of Kasim

•	1987 – The performance of "Farewell ... and applaud" (Alexei Bogdanovich).The director was Oleg Tabakov – Theodora Medebak, actress

•	1987 – The performance of "Biloxi-Blues" (N. Simon). The director was Oleg Tabakov – Daisy

•	1987 – The performance of "Belief. Love. Hope" (E. von Horwat) – Elisabeth

•	1988 – The performance of "Hole" (A. Galin).The director was Alexander Galin – Pardo

•	1991 – The performance of "Auditor" (N. V. Gogol). The director was Sergey Gazarov – Anna Andreevna

•	1995 – The performance of "Psycho" (A. Minchin). The directed was Andrey Zhitinkin – Lina Dmitrievna

•	1995 – The performance of "The Last" (M. Gorky). The director was A. Shapiro – Mrs. Sokolova

•	2000 – The performance of "One hundred yen for the service" (Minoru Betsuyak). The director was Elena Nevezhina – She

•	2000 – The performance of "At the bottom"( M. Gorky). The director was A. Shapiro – Nastena

•	2000 – The performance of "Another Van Gogh." The director was V. Fokin – Mother

•	2002 – The performance of The City (Evgeny Grishkovets). The director was Alexander Nazarov – Tatiana

•	2004 – The performance of "When I was dying" (W. Faulkner). The directed was Mindaugas Karbauskis – Addi Bandren

•	2005 – The performance of "Bolero" (P. Kogout). The directed was Vladimir Petrov – Hermina

•	2007 – The performance of "The Process" (F. Kafka). The director was Konstantin Bogomolov – Frau Grubach, Director of the Chancery

•	2007 – The performance of "The overstocked barrel" (V. P Aksyonov). The directed was Evgeny Kamenkovich – Stepanida Efimovna

•	2017 – The performance of «Nights of Cabiria» (Federico Fellini)The directed was – Alyona Lapteva and Yanina Kolesnichenko – The old beggar

The Moscow Art Theatre (or MAT)

•	2004 – The performance of "The Cherry Orchard" (A. P. Chekhov). The by director Adolf Shapiro – Charlotte Ivanovna, the governess

•	2006 – The performance of "The last mistake of Mozart" (D. Minchek). By the director Y. Eryomin – Constantius

Entreprise performances

•	1992 – The performance of "The Title". The director was Alexander Galin (Italy).

•	1993 – The performance of "Mystery" – a performance in English.

•	1994 – The performance of "Four wheels in the flesh" (Pyotr Gladilin). The director was Evgeny Kamenkovic

•	1997 – The performance of "The Dead Monkey". The director was A. V. Parra

•	1997 – The performance of "The Swarthy Lady of Sonnets" (B. Shaw). The director was A. V. Parra – The Queen Elizabeth. Television performance

•	1999 – The performance of "The Athenian Evenings" (Pyotr Gladilin). The director was Nikolay Chindyaykin.

•	2012 – The performance of "I am Edmon Dantes" the Musical. The director was Egor Druzhinin. Music Laura Kvint – Heloise Vilfor

•	2014 – The performance of "Faina. The bird soaring in a cage". The director was Stanislav Yevstigneyev – Lyubov Orlova

•	2014 – The performance of "The Imagination Game". (Emil Braginsky). The director was Vyacheslav Nevinny – Rita

•	2017 – The performance of "The Arc de Triomphe" (Erich Maria Remarque). The director was – Eugenie

2018 – The show "The Dance Teacher" (Lope de Vega). Director of Lev Rakhlin – Lysena

Director's works

•	2014 – The performance of "Leap into bed". Studio "25th row"

•	2015 – The performance of "Unholy". Studio "25th row"

•	2016 – The performance of "Express« California". Performance of the company FIT

•	2017 – The performance of "Wake yourself." MITRO

Selected filmography 

1.1975 – In anticipation of a miracle – The daughter of Sidorkin

2. 1976 – Minors – Vera

3. 1976 – The Draw – Dasha Rozanova

4. 1976 – Trainee – Friend of Katya Savelieva

5. 1977 – Return of the son – Tonja

6. 1977 – Gift of fate – Weaver

7. 1977 – The Portrait with the rain – Marina Kulikova

8. 1978 – At the bottom (short) – Natasha in the credits of D. Germanova

9. 1979 – Scenes from family life – Lille, the girlfriend Katia

10. 1980 – Tell yourself – Nadya Romashkina

11. 1980 – The Strange holiday

12. 1982 – Stoves – Lelia, wife of Alexei Trofimovich

13. 1982 – The Wedding gift – Oksana – a leading role

14. 1985 – We are not allowed to foresee ... (a short story from the book "Manka") – Tanya Ageeva

15. 1987 – The Armchair / Kreslo – The Milochka

16. 1987 – Are We This? – She

17. 1987 – Men's portraits – Alla Oseneva (theater actress)

18. 1988 – Comment on petition for clemency – Red

19. 1988 – The New Adventures of the Yankees at the Court of King Arthur – Sandy

20. 1988 – Tales of Italy

21. 1988 – Incident in Utinozersk – Albina Vasilievna

22. 1989 – Here it is – freedom! Itt a szabadság! (Hungary) – Dusya

23. 1989 – Marakuta (short)

24. 1989 – Life on the Limit – Svetka

25. 1989 – Crazy – Vera

26. 1991 – The Middle Circle | Inner Circle, The | Il proiezionista (Italy, USA, USSR) educator in the orphanage

27. 1991 – Kicks – Jeanne Plavskaya

28. 1991 – Dead Without Burial, or Hunting in the Rat

29. 1991 – Niagara – Larissa ("Niagara")

30. 1991 – Staru-ha-rmsa – The lady a leading role

31. 1991 – Auditor (film-play) – Anna Andreevna wife of the governor

32. 1992 – Death macaroni, or Professor Buggensberg's mistake – Sonka the Golden Pen

33. 1993 – Cherry Orchard – Charlotte

34. 1993 – The Way of Murder (Ukraine) – Virginia Dodge

35. 1994 – Sickle and hammer – Vera Raevskaya

36. 1995 – Muslim – Verka

37. 1995 – This is us!

38. 1997 – "Swarthy Lady of Sonnets" B. Shaw. Director A. V. Parra – Queen Elizabeth. Television performance

39. 1998 – Falling upwards (Belarus)

40. 2000 – Own Shadow – Rita 

41. 2000 – To be remembered (documentary) 2000 Igor Nefedov | Film 622000

42. 2001 – Detectives – Daria

43. 2001 – Emigrant, or Beard with glasses and warthog – Tuzik

44. 2001 – 2004 – Rostov-papa – The client of the poet, Varvara

45. 2002 – Leading roles – Russo

46. 2003 – The Barbarian (USA) – The witch of Barbarian Witch (witch))

47. 2003 – Dasha Vasilyeva. The lover of private investigation – Jacqueline

48. 2003 – The Best city of Earth – Chusova

49. 2003 – Present me life – Natasha, Olga's mother

50. 2003 – Church under birches – Tamara Sugrobova, "Lyubov Orlova"

51. 2004 – My big Armenian wedding – Lille

52. 2004 – Russian – Raisa Fiodorovna, Ad's mother

53. 2004 – Narrow Bridge – An episode

54. 2004 – 2005 – Be careful, Zadov! – Sister

55. 2004 – Last (film-play)

56. 2005 – Time to collect stones – Nyura

57. 2005 – Psycho – Lina Dmitrievna, the doctor-murderer

58. 2006 – Hunter – Valentine, a witch in the past / employee of the editorial office

59. 2006 – The color of the sky – A woman with a pin

60. 2007 – Vanechka – Director of the child's home

61. 2007 – A branch of lilac – Satina

62. 2007 – 2009 – The Fire of Love – Claudia / Aunt Katya

63. 2008 – Both shines, and heats (the director's term paper of Olga Kormukhina)

64. 2008 – the Girl – Irina Vadimovna Yartseva, mother of Lena

65. 2008 – Heritage – Valentina Semyonovna, mother of Sergei

66. 2008 – New Year's family (Ukraine) – Natalia Stepanovna Stargorodskaya

67. 2008 – Drawing – Mother of Tai

68. 2009 – Barvikha – Jeanette, the cleaner

69. 2009 – Jurov – Amalia Berulava, circus performer

70. 2009 – The forty – Third issue is Andrei's mother

71. 2009 – Roof – The woman of Nyura

72. 2010 – The Hen night – Albina Matveevna

73. 2010 – The House of the sun – The head of tourist group

74. 2010 – To Marry the millionaire! – Klara Stepanovna, Semyon's mother

75. 2010 – Oleg Tabakov. Lighting stars (documentary)

76. 2010 – At everyone the war – The aunt Katya Gavroche's mother

77. 2010 – Death in eye-glasses, or our Chekhov – Charlotte

78. 2010 – Flowers from Lisa – Margarita Nikolaevna

79. 2010 – Once there was a woman – Feklusha

80. 2011 – For Life – Lusia

81. 2012 – Crime by Succession – Rina's mother Pavel

82. 2012 – Petrovich – Raisa Stepanovna Nikitina / Tamara Stepanovna Nikitina Senior teacher / twin sister Raisa

83. 2012 – Cherry Orchard – (film-play) – Charlotte Ivanovna governess

84. 2013 – Sex, coffee, cigarettes – Flora Varfolomeevna professor

85. 2013 – Two winters and three summers – Sophia

86. 2015 – Lady disappears at midnight – Renata Nemirovskaya / Gennady's girlfriend

87. 2017 – Anna Karenina. History of Vronsky – Countess Kartasova

88. 2017 – Anna Karenina – Countess Kartasova

References

External links

1959 births
Living people
Soviet film actresses
Soviet television actresses
Soviet stage actresses
Russian film actresses
Russian television actresses
Russian stage actresses
Actresses from Moscow
20th-century Russian actresses
21st-century Russian actresses
Honored Artists of the Russian Federation
Soviet child actresses